Warner Bros. Discovery has owned and operated several animation studios since its founding on February 10, 1972 as WarnerMedia, before merging with Discovery, Inc. on April 8, 2022, including its flagship feature animation studio Warner Bros. Animation through Warner Bros. Entertainment that claims heritage from this original studio.

Besides Warner Bros. Animation, Warner Bros. Discovery also presently operates the Warner Animation Group, Cartoon Network Studios, and Williams Street (both through The Cartoon Network, Inc.). This article does not include other animation studios not owned by Warner Bros despite being released by Warner Bros. Pictures.

Full list

Warner Bros. Pictures Group

Warner Bros. Feature Animation
Warner Bros. Feature Animation, a division of Warner Bros. Pictures Group, opened in 1991 with 360 employees in Burbank, and another 100 employees in London. Warner Bros. placed veteran film producer Max Howard in charge of the new division

Projects

Warner Animation Group

The Warner Animation Group (officially abbreviated to WAG) was created in 2013, by Jeff Robinov to create animated theatrical films for Warner Bros. Pictures, and to replace the shuttered Warner Bros. Feature Animation which closed in 2004.

Projects

Warner Bros. Television Group

Warner Bros. Animation

Warner Bros. Cartoons

Established in 1933, after Harman and Ising who had been creating animated shorts for Warner Bros. since 1927, left for Metro-Goldwyn-Mayer. Warner Bros. Cartoons began creating animated shorts for the company, going on to launch the most famous characters in history, Bugs Bunny, Porky Pig and Daffy Duck for the Looney Tunes and Merrie Melodies series. The animation studio created dozens of award-winning shorts before shuttering in 1969.

Projects

Cartoon Network Studios

Founded in 1994, Cartoon Network Studios originated as a division of Hanna-Barbera, that focused on producing original programing for Cartoon Network including Dexter's Laboratory, Johnny Bravo, and The Powerpuff Girls. Following the merger of Hanna-Barbera's parent, Turner Broadcasting System with Time Warner, the Hanna-Barbera studio was folded into Warner Bros. Animation by its chief executive, Jean MacCurdy. After Hanna-Barbera merged into Warner Bros. Animation, Cartoon Network Studios was resurrected as a separate entity.

Williams Street

Created in 1994, Williams Street Productions was started by Cartoon Network to produce more adult-targeted serials for the network. Being the main production arm of Adult Swim, the division started as Ghost Planet Industries, named after the home planet of the titular character of their first production, Space Ghost Coast to Coast.

Turner Entertainment

Hanna-Barbera Cartoons
Started in 1957 by Tom and Jerry creators William Hanna and Joseph Barbera. The company went on to create numerous television shows. In 1991, the studio was acquired by Turner Broadcasting System, and began creating media exclusively for Cartoon Network. In 1998 it was moved to the same complex as Warner Bros. Animation, before the two companies were merged in 2001. Hanna-Barbera exists only as a copyright holder to their old properties.

Turner Feature Animation
Founded in 1994, Turner Feature Animation was created from the feature animation division of Hanna-Barbera. After its first film in 1994, the studio's parent company Turner Entertainment was bought by Time Warner in 1996, and the Turner Feature Animation division was folded into Warner Bros. Feature Animation before the release of their second and final film.

Projects

Notes

References

Warner Bros. Discovery
Warner Bros. Animation
Cartoon Network Studios
Turner Broadcasting System
Warner Animation Group
Warner Bros.
Warner Bros. Discovery subsidiaries
Animation studios